Dubovec is a village in the Krapina-Zagorje County in northern Croatia.

References

Populated places in Krapina-Zagorje County